Kudzai Maunze (born 10 April 1991) is a Zimbabwean first-class cricketer. In December 2020, he was selected to play for the Eagles in the 2020–21 Logan Cup.

References

External links
 

1991 births
Living people
Zimbabwean cricketers
Centrals cricketers
Southern Rocks cricketers
Sportspeople from Harare